or  ("wall", and , "bang") refers to the action of slapping a wall fiercely, which produces the sound "don". One meaning is the action of slapping the wall as a protest which occurs in collective housing like condominiums when the next room makes noise. Another meaning often appears in shōjo manga or anime when one character forces another against the wall with one hand or leans against the wall and makes the sound of "don", and this has become popular as a "clever move of confession".

Origins 
The term  first appeared in 2008 when voice actor Ryōko Shintani described it as "lovely situation". It has been popularized in the shōjo manga L DK by author Ayu Watanabe; and in April 2014, the manga was adapted into a live-action film. Afterwards, the term started to become familiar to the public and has appeared in multiple shojo manga stories.

Usage 
In Japan,  mainly appears in plots of girls' manga or anime when a man forces the woman against the wall; at the same time, his hand slaps the wall and surrounds the woman, and the sound of "don" is produced.

In Japan, the walls of many accommodation buildings are thin and not insulated against sound. As such, simple actions like closing a door or turning on the television can easily be heard by neighbors. When this noise becomes too loud to bear, Japanese people tend to bang their connecting walls in protest.

The practice of kabedon was borrowed into Chinese with the pronunciation bidong (bìdōng) through television dramas like My Sunshine. In Hong Kong, the actor Gregory Wong performed the bidong in a commercial for Listerine mouthwash.

See also

 Glossary of anime and manga
 Japanese sound symbolism

References 

2008 neologisms
Anime and manga terminology
Japanese words and phrases
Sound symbolism
Society of Japan